The Screen Award for Best Male Playback singer is chosen by a distinguished panel of judges from the Indian Bollywood film industry and the winners are announced in January.

Winners

Most wins

List of winners

See also
 Screen Awards
 Bollywood
 Cinema of India

References
http://www.awardsandshows.com/features/best-male-playback-73.html

Screen Awards